Arque may refer to:

 Arque, location in the Cochabamba Department, Bolivia 
 Arque Municipality, municipal section of the Arque Province in the Cochabamba Department, Bolivia 
 Arque Province, rural province in Cochabamba Department in the South American state of Bolivia
 Arque River, one of the headwaters of Río Grande and Mamoré River in Bolivia